Century Pacific Food Inc. (CNPF) is a Philippine food processing company based in Pasig, Metro Manila, Philippines. It is a wholly-owned subsidiary of Century Pacific Group, Inc.

History
On October 25, 2013, Century Pacific Food Inc. was incorporated as a subsidiary of Century Pacific Group, Inc. (formerly Century Canning Corporation) to consolidate the food manufacturing portfolio of the Century Pacific Group. It became listed in the Philippine Stock Exchange on May 6, 2014. The parent, Century Pacific Group, Inc., was established by Ricardo S. Po Sr. on December 12, 1978 as Century Canning Corporation, whose primary business was the distribution and sales of canned and processed fish products derived from tuna, sardines, and milkfish.

Brands 
 555
 Angel 
 Argentina
 Birch Tree 
 Blue Bay 
 Century Quality
 Century Tuna 
 Choco Hero
 Coco Mama 
 Fresca 
 Home Pride 
 Hunt's (under license from Conagra Brands)
 Kaffe de Oro 
 Ligo
 Lucky 7 
 Proteus
 Shanghai 
 Swift 
 
 
 Wow

Subsidiaries 
 General Tuna Corporation
 Snow Mountain Dairy Corporation
 Allforward Warehousing, Inc.
 Century Pacific Agricultural Ventures, Inc.
 Century Pacific Seacrest, Inc.
 Century Pacific Food Packaging Ventures, Inc.
 Centennial Global Corporation
 Cindena Resources Limited
 Century (Shanghai) Trading Company Limited
 Century International (China) Company Limited
 Century Pacific North America Enterprises, Inc.

Awards and recognition 
Century Pacific Food, Inc. successfully completed its initial public offering in 2014, which was awarded as the Best Deal in the Philippines by Asset Publishing & Research Ltd. The company was also recognized as Best Managed Small Cap Company in the Philippines in 2016 by Asia Money and Philippines’ Best Mid Cap Company in 2017-18 by Finance Asia.

References

External links 
 

Companies listed on the Philippine Stock Exchange
Companies based in Pasig
Food and drink companies of the Philippines
Food and drink companies established in 2013
Dairy products companies of the Philippines
Meat companies of the Philippines
Condiment companies of the Philippines
Philippine companies established in 2013